Dream Boy or Dreamboy may refer to:

 "Dream Boy", a song released in 1961 by Annette Funicello
 "Dream Boy", a song released in 1964 by The Angels
 Dream Boy, a 1995 novel by Jim Grimsley
 Dreamboy, a 2005 Filipino film
 Dream Boy (film), a 2008 American film based on Jim Grimsley's novel
 Dream Boy (comics), a fictional DC Comics superhero